The National Prize for Performing and Audiovisual Arts was created in Chile in 1992 under Law 19169 as one of the replacements of the National Prize of Art. It is granted "to the person who has distinguished themselves by their achievements in the respective area of the arts" (Article 8 of the aforementioned law). It is part of the National Prize of Chile.

The prize, which is awarded every two years, consists of a diploma, the sum of 6,576,457 pesos which is adjusted every year, according to the previous year's consumer price index, and a pension of 20  (approximately US$1,600).

Winners

References

1992 establishments in Chile
Chilean awards
Performing arts awards
1992 in Chilean law